Denford Park is a country house and surrounding estate in the English county of Berkshire, within the civil parish of Kintbury.

Denford  House was extended in 1832 for George Henry Cherry who bought it from William Hallett Esq the original owner, being designed by the architect, Jeffery Wyattville. It was the home of Apsley Cherry-Garrard, the Antarctic explorer. Between 1967 and 2002, the building housed Norland College.

In 2002 Denford Park was purchased by Faisal bin Salman bin Abdulaziz Al Saud and is the location of his Denford Stud.

References

External links
Royal Berkshire History: Denford House
Denford Park House frontage

Grade II listed buildings in Berkshire
Country houses in Berkshire
Jeffry Wyatville buildings
Grade II listed houses
Kintbury